Daniele Vantaggiato (born 10 October 1984) is an Italian footballer who plays for Livorno as a striker.

Career

Bari
Vantaggiato started his career at Bari. He made his Serie B debut on 26 January 2003, against Triestina.

He was sold to Crotone in joint-ownership bid in 2003, where he won Serie B promotion. Vantaggiato returned to Bari in June 2005. He was the regular of the squad before left for Pescara, who was then struggling to keep from relegation to Serie C1.

Rimini
In summer 2007, he left for Rimini for another joint-ownership bid, for €830,000, replacing Davide Moscardelli, after not appeared on the pre-season medical test for Bari. After Jeda left for Cagliari in January 2008, Vantaggiato became the team leading scorer. At the end of season Rimini won the blind bidding to have the full ownership for an undisclosed fee.

Parma
But in January 2009, his 13 goals scored in mid-season made Parma F.C. signed him (€1.9M) along with teammate Francesco Lunardini (€1M) in co-ownership deal, in exchange for Davide Matteini (50% for €1M) and Daniele Paponi on loan. Vantaggiato and Lunardini also cost Parma an additional €130,000 and €49,000 as other fee respectively. Parma won promotion back to Serie A as 2008–09 Serie B runner-up.

Vantaggiato was not featured in Parma's first three matches of 2009–10 Serie A, as the club signed new players. On 31 August 2009 he was loaned to Torino in exchange for Blerim Džemaili.

Padova
In January 2010, Parma acquired the remain 50% registration rights of Vantaggiato from Rimini for €1.9M (while Lunardini joined Parma outright in June from Rimini for €100,000), but re-sold the 50% registration rights to Calcio Padova for €1 million cash and 50% registration rights of Pietro Baccolo, which was valued for €1.5 million. Vantaggiato signed a -year contract. In June 2010 the co-ownerships were renewed.

In June 2011 both Parma and Padova gave up the remain 50% registration rights to opposite club.

Bologna (loan)
Vantaggiato then loaned to Serie A club Bologna F.C. 1909 in July 2011 with option to purchase. Vantaggiato signed a 1+2 year contract with the first year worth €842,165 in gross. Vantaggiato only played twice in October 2011.

Italian football scandal
In April 2012 Vantaggiato was questioned by the prosecutor for the matches during his stay in Rimini. In June 2012 he was banned for 3 years for involvement in 2011–12 Italian football scandal. His ban was reduced to 6 months by Tribunale Nazionale di Arbitrato per lo Sport of Italian National Olympic Committee.

Return to Padova
After the ban was reduced, Vantaggiato played an additional 37 Serie B games for Padova, 7 from 2012–13 season and 30 from 2013–14 season. On 7 August 2013 he signed a new 3-year contract with Padova. After the club failed to register for 2014–15 Lega Pro, he was released.

Livorno
Vantaggiato was signed by A.S. Livorno Calcio in summer 2014.

Return to Livorno
On 1 October 2021, he returned to newly reformed Livorno, now at amateur levels.

Honours

Club
Crotone
Serie C1 runner-up/promotion playoffs winner: 2004

References

External links
Profile at La Gazzetta dello Sport 

Italian footballers
S.S.C. Bari players
F.C. Crotone players
Rimini F.C. 1912 players
Parma Calcio 1913 players
Calcio Padova players
Association football forwards
People from Brindisi
1984 births
Living people
Delfino Pescara 1936 players
Torino F.C. players
Bologna F.C. 1909 players
U.S. Livorno 1915 players
Ternana Calcio players
Serie A players
Serie B players
Serie C players
Footballers from Apulia
Sportspeople from the Province of Brindisi